Amália Revisited is a tribute album by various artists and bands to famous Portuguese fadista Amália Rodrigues. It was released on February 7, 2005 by Different World.

Metrô is the only Brazilian band to take part on the album; all the other artists hail from Portugal.

Track listing

References

External links
 Amália Revisited at Discogs

2005 compilation albums
Tribute albums
Portuguese-language compilation albums